Dutch Chilean are Chilean people of Dutch descent.

Background 
In 1600, the Chilean city of Valdivia was conquered by Dutch pirate Sebastian de Cordes. He left the city after a few months. Four decades later, in 1642, the VOC and the WIC sent a fleet of ships to Chile to take control of Valdivia and its Spanish gold mines. The expedition was conducted by Hendrik Brouwer, a Dutch general. In 1643 Brouwer conquered the Chiloé Archipelago and Valdivia. After Brouwer died on 7 August 1643, vice-general Elias Herckmans took control. (The New Flanders Colony).

Dutch colonization in Chile
The second emigration from the Netherlands to Chile occurred in 1895. A dozen Dutch families settled in Chile between 1895 and 1897, particularly in Mechaico, Huillinco and Chacao. Egbert Hageman arrived in Chile with his family, on 14 April 1896, settling in Rio Gato, near Puerto Montt. The Wennekool family inaugurated the Dutch colonization of Villarrica.

In the early twentieth century, a large group of Dutch people arrived in Chile from South Africa. These migrants, after a long stay in African camps, were presented with the opportunity to emigrate to Chile with the help of the Chilean government.

On 4 May 1903, a group of over 200 Dutch sailed on the steamship "Oropesa" owned by the shipping company "Pacific Steam Navigation Company", from La Rochelle (La Pallice) in France. The majority had been born in the Netherlands (35% from North Holland and South Holland, 13% from North Brabant, 9% from Zeeland and an equal number of Gelderland). Only a dozen children had been born in South Africa. On June 5, the arrived by train to the city of Pitrufquén. 

Another group of Dutchmen arrived shortly after to Talcahuano, in the "Oravi" and the "Orissa". The Netherlands colony in Donguil was christened "New Transvaal Colony". More than 500 Dutch families moved there. The last group of Boers arrived between 7 February 1907 and February 18, 1909.

Some 50,000 descendants remain, mostly located in Malleco, Gorbea, Pitrufquén, Faja Maisan and around Temuco.

Notable Dutch Chileans
 Jacqueline van Rysselberghe, Chilean Politician
 Shmuel Szteinhendler, rabbi (Regional Director of Masorti Olami Latin America)
 Peter Mociulski von Remenyk, Rock and roll musician
 Denisse van Lamoen, a Chilean archer
 Felipe van de Wyngard, Chilean triathlete
Cristobal Tapia De Veer, film and television score composer

See also
 Basque Chileans
 German Chileans
 British Chileans

References

External links
  Netherlands in Chile.

 

European Chilean
Chile
Chile